Year 1256 (MCCLVI) was a leap year starting on Saturday (link will display the full calendar) of the Julian calendar.

Events 
 By place 

 Mongol Empire 
 Spring – Mongol forces (some 80,000 men), under Hulagu Khan, cross the Oxus River, and begin their campaign to destroy the remaining Muslim states in southwestern Asia – with the first objectives being the Nizari Ismaili strongholds and Baghdad, the capital of the Abbasid Caliphate. The roads across Turkestan and Persia are repaired, and bridges built. Carts are requisitioned to bring siege machines from China.
 October – Mongol forces led by Baiju Noyan (operating under Hulagu Khan's command) win a victory over Kaykaus II, Seljuk ruler of the Sultanate of Rum, and capture Anatolia. Kaykaus flees to the Byzantine court where he seeks refuge at Constantinople. The Empire of Trebizond fearing a potential punitive Mongol expedition, becomes a vassal state and is forced to pay a tribute tax every year in gold and silk.
 November 8–23 – Siege of Maymun-Diz: Mongol forces under Hulagu Khan successfully besiege the mountain castle of Maymun-Diz. Hulagu encircles the fortress and begins a bombardment for three days by mangonels from a nearby hilltop. On November 19, Nizari Isma'ili imam Rukn al-Din Khurshah surrenders, but a small part of the garrison refuses and fights a last stand, until they are killed after three days.
 December 15 – Mongol forces under Hulagu Khan capture and dismantle Alamut Castle (near the Masoudabad region) after the surrender of the Nizari Ismaili leaders. Hulagu founds the Ilkhanate dynasty of Persia, which becomes one of the four main divisions of the Mongol Empire. The Nizari Ismaili government is disestablished, some of them migrate to Afghanistan, Badakhshan and Sindh (modern Pakistan).

 Europe 
 War of the Euboeote Succession: Achaean forces under William II of Villehardouin attempt to gain control of the island of Euboea, which is resisted by the local Lombard barons (or "triarchs") with the aid of the Republic of Venice. Wiilliam launches devastating raids in Euboea. Guy I de la Roche, the "Great Lord" of Athens and Thebes, enters the war against William, along with other barons of Central Greece.

 British Isles 
 Prince Llywelyn ap Gruffudd invades the northern coastal areas that have agreed to English rule (see 1254). Edward (the Lord Edward), who has been given the areas to govern himself by his father, King Henry III, asks him for support but Henry refuses. 
 The ancient Irish Kingdom of Breifne splits into East Breifne and West Breifne, after a war between the O'Reillys and the O'Rourkes.

 Levant 
 Venetian–Genoese War: A dispute between Venice and Genoa arises about concerning land in Acre owned by Mar Saba but claimed by both Venice and Genoa – which leads to a Genoese attack of the monastery in the Venetian quarter. The Venetians are supported by Pisa and the Knights Templar, while the Genoese are joined by the Knights Hospitaller.

 Asia 
 October – The Japanese Kenchō era ends and the Kōgen era begins during the reign of the 13-year-old Emperor Go-Fukakusa.

 By topic 

 Natural Disaster 
 June 30 – A large volcanic eruption in Harrat Rahat (near Medina) is associated with an Islamic prophecy.

 Religion 
 May 4 – Pope Alexander IV issues the papal bull Licet ecclesiae catholicae, constituting the Order of Saint Augustine at Lecceto Monastery.
 August 25 – In Bologna, slavery and serfdom are abolished; this event is recorded in the document called Liber Paradisus (or Heaven Book).

Births 
 January 6 – Gertrude the Great, German mystic (d. 1302)
 January 24 – Alonso Pérez de Guzmán, Spanish nobleman (d. 1309)
 February 9 – William de Warenne, English nobleman (d. 1286)
 March 21 – Henry I (Lackland), German nobleman (d. 1318)
 October 23 – Möngke Temür, Mongol ruler of Shiraz (d. 1282)
 Abu Hayyan al-Gharnati, Andalusian grammarian (d. 1344)
 Adolph VI, count of Holstein-Pinneberg-Schauenburg (d. 1315)
 Ahmad al-Suhrawardi, Persian calligrapher and musician (d. 1340)
 Al-Dimashqi, Syrian geographer, explorer and writer (d. 1327)
 Andrea Dotti, Italian nobleman, preacher and saint (d. 1315)
 Ibn al-Banna, Almohad scholar and mathematician (d. 1321)
 Jamal al-Din al-Mizzi, Syrian scholar and philologist (d. 1341)
 John Segrave, English nobleman and seneschal (d. 1325)
 Padishah Khatun, Mongol female ruler and writer (d. 1295)
 Robert of Clermont, French prince and nobleman (d. 1317)
 Roger Mortimer, English nobleman and constable (d. 1326)

Deaths 
 January 4 – Bernhard von Spanheim, German nobleman
 January 18 – Maria of Brabant, duchess of Bavaria (b. 1226)
 January 28 – William II of Holland, king of Germany (b. 1227)
 February 9 – Alice de Lusigan, English noblewoman (b. 1224)
 February 16 – Nicola Paglia, Italian Dominican priest (b. 1197)
 April 12 – Margaret of Bourbon, queen of Navarre (b. 1217)
 April 23 – Sabrisho V, patriarch of the Church of the East
 May 1 – Mafalda of Portugal, Spanish abbess and queen 
 May 6 – Peter Nolasco, French religious leader (b. 1189)
 May 12 – Matilda of Amboise, French noblewoman (b. 1200)
 May 28 – Guglielmo Fieschi, Italian deacon and cardinal
 June 13 – Tankei, Japanese Buddhist sculptor (b. 1173)
 September 1 – Kujō Yoritsune, Japanese shogun (b. 1218)
 September 21 – William of Kilkenny, English bishop of Ely
 October 14 – Kujō Yoritsugu, Japanese shogun (b. 1239)
 November 5 – Christina de Valognes, Scottish noblewoman
 Bertram de Criol (or Criel), English constable and diplomat
 Jacob Anatoli, French Jewish translator and writer (b. 1194)
 Johannes de Sacrobosco, English scholar and astronomer 
 Klement of Ruszcza, Polish nobleman and knight (b. 1190)
 Najm al-Din Razi, Persian philosopher and writer (b. 1177)
 Pandulf of Anagni, Italian bishop and military commander
 Peter de Ramsay, Scottish nobleman, cleric and bishop
 Þórður kakali Sighvatsson, Icelandic chieftain (b. 1210)
 Rodrigo González Girón, Spanish nobleman and knight
 Sibt ibn al-Jawzi, Arab preacher and historian (b. 1185)

References